is a private university in Mitaka, Tokyo, Japan. The predecessor of the school was founded in 1930, and it was chartered as a university in 1949.

Tokyo Union Theological Seminary is a Seminary of the United Church of Christ in Japan.

Faculty 

 Kazoh Kitamori, author of Theology of the Pain of God

External links
 Official website 

Educational institutions established in 1930
Christian universities and colleges in Japan
Private universities and colleges in Japan
Universities and colleges in Tokyo
Western Tokyo
United Church of Christ in Japan
1930 establishments in Japan
Mitaka, Tokyo
Seminaries and theological colleges in Japan
Protestant universities and colleges in Asia